This is a list of notable events in country music that took place in 1963.

Events
March — The month marks a dark time for country music, as it lost no less than five people in a seemingly endless string of tragedies.
 * On March 5, three of the genre's top stars – Patsy Cline, Hawkshaw Hawkins and Cowboy Copas – are killed in a small plane crash near Camden, Tennessee, while on their way to Nashville from Kansas City, Kansas. The pilot, Cline's manager and Copas' son-in-law, Randy Hughes, is also killed.
 * En route to Cline's funeral, Jack Anglin – one half of the duo Johnnie & Jack – is killed in a car accident.
 * On March 29, Texas Ruby, of the duo Curly Fox and Texas Ruby, is killed in a trailer fire while Fox was performing on the Grand Ole Opry.
July — The first issue of the Music City News is published. Its publisher is country music star Faron Young.
August – Bradley Kincaid, a pioneer of the genre who had been popular on records and radio from the late 1920s until his retirement in 1950, made new recordings of 168 of his favourite songs – more than half of his known repertoire – at a five-day session for Bluebonnet Records in Fort Worth, Texas. 86 of these songs would be issued on seven LP's between 1963 and 1987, the remainder were issued on six Cassette Tapes in 1988.
September 19 — The Jimmy Dean Show begins a three-year primetime run on ABC. The show — Dean's second go-around on television, following his 1950s series on CBS — is widely hailed by critics for its class treatment of top country stars of the day, many of whom were getting their first true national exposure.

No dates
 The Wilburn Brothers' TV show debuts in syndication, and features Loretta Lynn as regular vocalist. The show will air first-run episodes, primarily in rural and southern U.S. markets, through 1974 and, riding the heels of Porter Wagoner's weekly TV show, will spark a wave of successful (and a few not-so-successful) syndicated TV shows featuring top-name country stars of the day through the late 1970s and early 1980s.

Top hits of the year

Number-one hits

United States
(as certified by Billboard)

Notes
1^ No. 1 song of the year, as determined by Billboard.
2^ Song dropped from No. 1 and later returned to top spot.
A^ First Billboard No. 1 hit for that artist.
B^ Only Billboard No. 1 hit for that artist to date.

Other major hits

Top new album releases

Other top albums

Births
 January 24 — Keech Rainwater, member of Lonestar.
 February 9 — Travis Tritt, country-rock influenced star starting in the early 1990s.
 February 17 – Larry the Cable Guy (born Daniel Lawrence Whitney), comedian and actor, member of Blue Collar Comedy with Jeff Foxworthy, Bill Engvall and Ron White
 July 31 — Chad Brock, rose to fame in the late 1990s.
 August 22 — Mila Mason, enjoyed fame in the late 1990s.
 September 6 — Mark Chesnutt, neotraditional country singer of the 1990s.
 September 30 — Eddie Montgomery, one half of Montgomery Gentry, older brother of John Michael Montgomery.
 November 1 — Big Kenny (born William Kenneth Alphin), one half of Big & Rich and key member of the MuzikMafia.
 December 3 — Ty England, contemporary-styled singer of the mid-1990s, and guitarist member of the Garth Brooks' band.
 December 16 — Jeff Carson, contemporary-styled singer of the mid-1990s.

Deaths
March 5 — Patsy Cline, 30, premier female country vocalist who became even more legendary after her death (plane crash).
March 5 — Cowboy Copas, 49, country singer from the 1940s through 1960s, best known for his 1960 hit, "Alabam" (plane crash).
March 5 — Hawkshaw Hawkins, 41, country singer since the 1940s, best known for his posthumous No. 1 hit, "Lonesome 7-7203" (plane crash).
March 8 — Jack Anglin, 47, country entertainer since the 1930s, late of the duo Johnnie and Jack (with Johnnie Wright) (car accident).
March 29 — Texas Ruby, 52, half of the comedy-old-time country duo Curly Fox and Texas Ruby (mobile home fire).
August 27 – Jim Denny, 52, music executive.

Country Music Hall of Fame Inductees
There were no inductees in 1963.

Major awards

Grammy Awards
Best Country and Western Recording — "Detroit City", Bobby Bare

See also
Billboard Top Country Singles of 1963
Country Music Association
Inductees of the Country Music Hall of Fame

Further reading
Kingsbury, Paul, "The Grand Ole Opry: History of Country Music. 70 Years of the Songs, the Stars and the Stories," Villard Books, Random House; Opryland USA, 1995
Kingsbury, Paul, "Vinyl Hayride: Country Music Album Covers 1947–1989," Country Music Foundation, 2003
Millard, Bob, "Country Music: 70 Years of America's Favorite Music," HarperCollins, New York, 1993
Whitburn, Joel, "Top Country Songs 1944–2005 – 6th Edition." 2005.

External links
Country Music Hall of Fame

Country
Country music by year